Poly Bridge 3 is an upcoming simulation-puzzle game developed and published by Dry Cactus. It is the third installment in the Poly Bridge series, and the sequel to Poly Bridge 2. The game is scheduled to be released for Linux, macOS and Microsoft Windows on 30 May 2023.

Gameplay
Poly Bridge 3 is confirmed to feature a new campaign which consists of over 100 levels. The game would also introduce another new material, foundation, which is expensive but effective at reducing stress. A sandbox mode would be available as well, allowing players to build bridges without the limitation of budget and resources.

Development and release
The game was revealed on 16 March 2023 by the creator of the series, New Zealand-based video game developer Dry Cactus, who returns to develop and publish the game. The game is set to be launched on 30 May 2023 for Linux, macOS and Microsoft Windows platforms.

References

Upcoming video games scheduled for 2023
Construction and management simulation games
Linux games
MacOS games
Puzzle video games
Single-player video games
Video games developed in New Zealand
Video game sequels
Windows games
Dry Cactus games